Lavalee, Lavallée or LaVallee may refer to:

 Lavallée, France
 Lavallee Lake (Saskatchewan), Canada
 Lavallee Peak, Antarctica
 R. v. Lavallee, a Canadian court case

People with the surname
 Alphonse Lavallée (1791–1873), founder École Centrale Paris, France
 Calixa Lavallée (1842–1891), songwriter, "O Canada"
 Carole Lavallée (1954hso introduced –2021), Canadian politician
 Jordan LaVallee (born 1986), American ice hockey player
 Kevin LaVallee (born 1961), Canadian ice hockey player
 Levi LaVallee (born 1982), American snowmobile racer
 Louis-Arsène Lavallée (1861–1936), Canadian politician, Mayor of Montreal
 Roger Lavallee, American musician and producer

See also
 
 La Vallée (disambiguation)
 Lavalle (disambiguation) or La Valle